Delhi Shahdara Junction railway station is a railway station in Shahdara which is a residential and commercial neighborhood of the East Delhi district of Delhi. Its code is DSA.

Trains 

 Haridwar–Bikaner Special Fare Special
 Garhwal Express
 Kalindi Express
 Mussoorie Express
 Sikkim Mahananda Express
 Farakka Express (via Faizabad)
 Farakka Express (via Sultanpur)
 Satyagrah Express
 Yoga Express
 Loknayak Express
 Amrapali Express
 Farrukhnagar–Saharanpur Janta Express
 Delhi–Ambala Cantonment Intercity Express
 Himachal Express

References

Railway junction stations in Delhi
Railway stations in North East Delhi district
Delhi railway division